is a Japanese actor and voice actor from Kanagawa Prefecture, Japan.

Filmography

Television drama
Kamen Rider Black RX (1989) – Doctor

Television animation
Cowboy Bebop (1998) – Bob
Ghost in the Shell: S.A.C. 2nd GIG (2002) – Ishikawa
Eureka Seven (2005) – Yucatán Iglasias
The Wings of Rean (2005) – Amalgam Rudol
Black Butler (2008) – Henry Barrymore
Kingdom (2012) – Changwenjun
Saint Seiya Omega (2012) – Leo Mycenae
Aikatsu! (2013) – Kurosaki
Hunter × Hunter (Second Series) (2013) - Zeburo
JoJo's Bizarre Adventure (2013) – Loggins
Ace of Diamond (2014) – Hiroshige Kunitomo
Tokyo Ghoul (2014) – Yukinori Shinohara
Drifters (2016) – Tamon Yamaguchi
Angolmois: Record of Mongol Invasion (2018) – Ōkura Yorisue
The Rising of the Shield Hero (2019) – Aultcray Melromarc XXXII
The Quintessential Quintuplets (2021) – The Nakano Quintuplets' Grandfather.

Original video animation (OVA)
Legend of the Galactic Heroes (1994) – Jawaf
ZOE: 2167 IDOLO (2001) – Lloyd
Ghost in the Shell: Stand Alone Complex - Solid State Society (2006) – Ishikawa

Original net animation (ONA)
Ghost in the Shell: SAC 2045 (2020) – Ishikawa

Theatrical animation
Ghost in the Shell (1995) – Ishikawa
Ghost in the Shell 2: Innocence (2004) – Ishikawa
Naruto the Movie: Ninja Clash in the Land of Snow (2004) – Ken/Buriken
The Princess and the Pilot (2011) – Domingo Garcia

Video games
Ghost in the Shell: Stand Alone Complex (2004) – Ishikawa
Shadow the Hedgehog (2005) – President
Super Robot Wars UX (2013) – Amalgam Rudol
Tales of Zestiria (2015) – Baltro

Dubbing roles

Live-action
12 Angry Men – The Foreman (Courtney B. Vance)
12 Monkeys – Zoologist (Simon Jones)
The 33 – André Sougarret (Gabriel Byrne)
A.I. Artificial Intelligence – Professor Allen Hobby (William Hurt)
Air Force One (2001 NTV edition) – Colonel Jack Carlton (Don McManus)
Albino Alligator – G.D. Browning (Joe Mantegna)
Amores perros – Daniel (Álvaro Guerrero)
Annie: A Royal Adventure! – Lord Chamberlain
Ant-Man – Howard Stark (John Slattery)
Antiviral – Dr. Abendroth (Malcolm McDowell)
August: Osage County – Beverly Weston (Sam Shepard)
Awake – Dr. Larry Lupin (Christopher McDonald)
Avengers: Endgame – Howard Stark (John Slattery)
Ballistic: Ecks vs. Sever – Julio Martin (Miguel Sandoval)
Batman v Superman: Dawn of Justice – Charlie Rose
Big Daddy – Homeless Guy (Steve Buscemi)
Blade – Gitano Dragonetti (Udo Kier)
Blade II – Dieter Reinhardt (Ron Perlman)
The Bridge – Lieutenant Hank Wade (Ted Levine)
Bridge of Dragons – General Ruechang (Cary-Hiroyuki Tagawa)
Casper – Paul "Dibs" Plutzker (Eric Idle)
Celebrity – Tony Gardella (Joe Mantegna)
Cellular – Jack Tanner (Noah Emmerich)
Chain Reaction – Lucasz Screbneski (Krzysztof Pieczyński)
Chicago Hope – Dr. Aaron Shutt (Adam Arkin)
The Counterfeiters – Dr. Klinger (August Zirner)
Crimson Peak – Carter Cushing (Jim Beaver)
Crimson Tide (2000 TV Asashi edition) – Lieutenant Roy Zimmer (Matt Craven)
Cube 2: Hypercube – Jerry Whitehall (Neil Crone)
Cube Zero – Jax (Michael Riley)
Devil's Due – Father Thomas (Sam Anderson)
Diabolique – Guy Baran (Chazz Palminteri)
Diagnosis: Murder – Lieutenant Detective Steve Sloan (Barry Van Dyke)
Die Hard with a Vengeance – Bill Jarvis (Michael Cristofer)
Drop Zone – Swoop (Kyle Secor)
Dudley Do-Right – Kim J. Darling (Eric Idle)
Dumb and Dumber – Joe "Mental" Mentalino (Mike Starr)
End of Days – Carson (Robert Lesser), Cardinal
Fair Game – Sam Plame (Sam Shepard)
Fargo – Lou Solverson (Keith Carradine)
Flags of Our Fathers – Technical Sergeant Keyes Beech (John Benjamin Hickey)
Footloose – Rev. Shaw Moore (Dennis Quaid)
Forrest Gump – Jenny's Father (Kevin Mangan)
From Hell – Netley (Jason Flemyng)
Genius – Philipp Lenard (Michael McElhatton)
Ghost in the Shell – Ishikawa (Lasarus Ratuere)
Ghostbusters: Afterlife – Ivo Shandor (J. K. Simmons)
G.I. Joe: Retaliation – General Joseph Colton (Bruce Willis)
The Godfather (2008 Blu-Ray edition) – Captain Mark McCluskey (Sterling Hayden), Emilio Barzini (Richard Conte)
Gossip Girl – Howard "The Captain" Archibald (Sam Robards)
Gotham – Detective Harvey Bullock (Donal Logue)
Greenland – Dale (Scott Glenn)
Guardians of the Galaxy – Garthan Saal (Peter Serafinowicz)
Hail, Caesar! – Laurence Laurentz (Ralph Fiennes)
Hereditary – Steve Graham (Gabriel Byrne)
Hidden Figures – Al Harrison (Kevin Costner)
Horrible Bosses – David Harken (Kevin Spacey)
Horrible Bosses 2 – David Harken (Kevin Spacey)
The Huntsman: Winter's War – King (Robert Portal)
I Am Sam – Mr. Turner (Richard Schiff)
In the Name of the King – Merick (John Rhys-Davies)
Jack Ryan: Shadow Recruit – Rob Behringer (Colm Feore)
John Q. – Dr. Raymond Turner (James Woods)
The King's Man – Herbert Kitchener (Charles Dance)
Kong: Skull Island – Senator Willis (Richard Jenkins)
Licence to Kill – Felix Leiter (David Hedison)
Limitless – Gennady (Andrew Howard)
Loaded Weapon 1 – Mr. Jigsaw (Tim Curry)
Looking for Richard – Richmond (Aidan Quinn)
The Man Who Invented Christmas – William Hall (David McSavage)
The Matrix Reloaded – The Keymaker (Randall Duk Kim)
The Matrix Revolutions – Captain Roland (David Roberts)
Max – Raymond "Ray" Wincott (Thomas Haden Church)
Michael Collins – (Ned Broy (Stephen Rea))
A Mighty Heart – Randall Bennett (Will Patton)
Mindscape – Sebastian (Brian Cox)
Minority Report – Eddie Solomon (Peter Stormare)
Mission: Impossible – Ghost Protocol – Kurt Hendricks (Michael Nyqvist)
Moonlight Mile – Ben Floss (Dustin Hoffman)
Mr. Brooks – Mr. Earl Brooks (Kevin Costner)
My Lovely Sam Soon – Lee Hyun-moo (Kwon Hae-hyo)
Nash Bridges – Lieutenant A.J. Shimamura (Cary-Hiroyuki Tagawa)
Nine Lives – Tom Brand (Kevin Spacey)
Nothing to Lose – Charlie Dunt (Giancarlo Esposito)
The Number 23 – Isaac French / Dr. Miles Phoenix (Danny Huston)
Only God Forgives – Lt. Chang / "The Angel of Vengeance" (Vithaya Pansringarm)
Outbreak – Major Casey Schuler (Kevin Spacey)
Oz the Great and Powerful – Girl in Wheelchair's Father (Ralph Lister)
Paycheck – Special Agent Dodge (Joe Morton)
Pirates of the Caribbean: On Stranger Tides – Purser (Steve Evets)
Platoon (2003 TV Tokyo edition) – Captain Harris (Dale Dye)
Pressure –  Engel (Danny Huston)
The Pretender – Broots (Jon Gries)
Proof of Life – Eric Kessler (Gottfried John)
The Protector – Lee Hing (Peter Yang)
The Quick and the Dead – Eugene Dred (Kevin Conway)
Race – Jeremiah Mahoney (William Hurt)
The Rock (2000 TV Asahi edition) – Captain Frye (Gregory Sporleder)
Rumor Has It – Beau Burroughs (Kevin Costner)
Sarah's Key – Bertrand Tezac (Frédéric Pierrot)
Saw series – Mark Hoffman (Costas Mandylor)
Scary Movie – Principal 'Squiggy' Squiggman (David Lander)
Shallow Grave – Hugo (Keith Allen)
The Shallows – Mr. Adams (Brett Cullen)
She-Wolf of London – Griscombe (Anderson Knight)
Sneaky Pete – Vince Lonigan (Bryan Cranston)
Sniper – Chester van Damme (J. T. Walsh)
Son of God – Pontius Pilate (Greg Hicks)
Spotlight – Ben Bradlee, Jr. (John Slattery)
Star Trek Into Darkness – Alexander Marcus (Peter Weller)
Taken – Jean-Claude Pitrel (Olivier Rabourdin)
The Terminator (1998 DVD edition) – Vukovich (Lance Henriksen)
The Tourist – Chief Inspector Jones (Timothy Dalton)
Training Day – Roger (Scott Glenn)
Transformers: Dark of the Moon – Walter Cronkite
Transformers: Age of Extinction – Harold Attinger (Kelsey Grammer)
Twin Peaks (2017) – Deputy Chief Tommy "Hawk" Hill (Michael Horse)
Unfaithful – Detective Dean (Željko Ivanek)
United 93 – Captain Jason Dahl (J. J. Johnson)
Universal Soldier: The Return – Dylan Cotner (Xander Berkeley)
Unthinkable – Jack Saunders (Martin Donovan)
Up Close & Personal – Bucky Terranova (Joe Mantegna)
U.S. Marshals – Noah Newman (Tom Wood)
USS Indianapolis: Men of Courage – Admiral William S. Parnell (James Remar)
Veteran – Seo Do-cheol (Hwang Jung-min)
The World's End – Guy Shepherd (Pierce Brosnan)

Animation
The Adventures of Tintin: The Secret of the Unicorn – Allan
Hilltop Hospital – Dr. Atticus
Looney Tunes – Pepe Le Pew (Succeeding from Hidetoshi Nakamura)
Incredibles 2 – Mayor 
Inside Out – Subconscious Guard Frank
Puss in Boots – Bartender
The Replacements – C.A.R.T.E.R.
Planes: Fire & Rescue – Winnie
Shrek Forever After – Gingy (Gingerbread Man)
Soul – Jerry
Star Wars: The Clone Wars – Faro Argyus

References

External links
 Official agency profile 
 

1951 births
Living people
Japanese male stage actors
Japanese male video game actors
Japanese male voice actors
Male voice actors from Kanagawa Prefecture
20th-century Japanese male actors
21st-century Japanese male actors